Kulcs is a village in Fejér county, Hungary

Located along the sandy shores of the great Danube River, Kulcs is located in Fejer County, in central Hungary.  Kulcs has some of the best air quality in Hungary, and that air is put to use with the town's own wind-powered turbine.  Steamboats were a common daily sight for locals until the 1960s.  Nowadays, commercial boats and tourist ferries from Budapest, Vienna and surrounding regions still travel past the village.

In the last 20 years, many larger parcels of grazing and farmland had begun to be sub-divided.  Kulcs was mainly settled as "summer residences" by apartment dwelling, middle-class families.  Many small, family-owned vinyards and orchards are still enjoyed by multiple generational families near Rácalmás and Dunaújváros town.  The term "kulcs" pronounced "cool-ch" translates to "key". A popular "nyaralótelep" or leisure village.

The village has been expanding, adding a heritage center, new elementary school, volunteer fire brigade and numerous cultural clubs, an expanding library and activities for the residents. The re-development of road infrastructure, telephone, cable TV, internet, are becoming increasingly attractive for permanent residency. On-staff doctor's office, pediatrician, pharmacy, dentistry, are all under one roof: the Regional Medical Center, built in 2004, offers post-surgery rehabilitation, one-day surgery, and outpatient care in primary healthcare. A private home for the elderly can also be found in Kulcs. The 140-student elementary school took up the name of eminent writer István Fekete.

Demographics
 Population data: 1996 main permanent residents: 1213.
 Population in 2006 main permanent residents: 2300.
 The number of homes, including summer homes: 2180.
 Population during the summer months reaches: 4500–4800.

External links 

 Street map 
 Kulcs Village Website

Populated places in Fejér County
Populated places on the Danube
Populated places in Hungary